Nader Dastneshan (29 November 1959 – 16 April 2021) was an Iranian football player and coach.

Early life
Nader Dastneshan was born on 24 May 1960 in Shaahi, Mazandaran Province. His father Azerbaijani was from Tabriz and his mother was from Sari. He has three sisters and five brothers; he was the youngest son in the family. At beginning of football, he was a goalkeeper but later he became midfielder.

Club career
He started his career in Nasaji Mazandaran and was in club until his retirement in 1993.

Coaching career
Dastneshan studied coaching techniques in FIFA and received a degree by AFC for coaching. He became assistant coach to Carlo Soldoy, Italian head coach of Iran under-20 national football team in 1997. Iran U-20 team came fourth in AFC Asian Cup at that year. He coached in many Iranian clubs and he is known as a manager who upgraded teams to Division 1 of Iranian football but he didn't manage for more than one year in each club.

Honours
Mes Kerman
Azadegan League: 2006–07

Pegah Gilan
Hazfi Cup: 2007–08 (Runner-up)

Steel Azin
Azadegan League: 2008–09

Naft Tehran
Azadegan League: 2009–10

Sanat Naft
Azadegan League: 2015–16

Death
Dastneshan died one week after being hospitalised due to COVID-19. He was 60 years old.

References 

1959 births
2021 deaths
Iranian footballers
Association football midfielders
Nassaji Mazandaran players
Iranian football managers
Sanat Mes Kerman F.C. managers
Iranian Azerbaijanis
People from Qaem Shahr
Sanat Naft Abadan F.C. managers
Deaths from the COVID-19 pandemic in Iran
F.C. Nassaji Mazandaran managers
Malavan F.C. managers
Sportspeople from Mazandaran province
Persian Gulf Pro League managers